The Steinitz exchange lemma is a basic theorem in linear algebra used, for example, to show that any two bases for a finite-dimensional vector space have the same number of elements. The result is named after the German mathematician Ernst Steinitz. The result is often called the Steinitz–Mac Lane exchange lemma, also recognizing the generalization
by Saunders Mac Lane
of Steinitz's lemma to matroids.

Statement 
Let  and  be finite subsets of a vector space . If  is a set of linearly independent vectors, and  spans , then:

1. ;

2. There is a set  with  such that  spans .

Proof

We wish to show that for each , we have that , and that the set  spans  (where the  have possibly been reordered, and the reordering depends on ).

For the base case, suppose  is zero.
In this case, the claim holds because there are no vectors , and the set  spans  by hypothesis.

Since , and  spans  (by the induction hypothesis), there exist coefficients  such that
.
Therefore, we have
 .
The latter span therefore contains each of the vectors , and hence must contain the span of these latter vectors as a subset.

We have thus shown that for each , we have that , and that the set  spans  (where the  have possibly been reordered, and the reordering depends on ).

The fact that  follows from setting  in this result.

---

Comment: The loop invariant  should be claimed or emphasized after each iteration in order to be an induction hypothesis at the next iteration.

Applications
The Steinitz exchange lemma is a basic result in computational mathematics, especially in linear algebra and in combinatorial algorithms.

References 

 Julio R. Bastida, Field extensions and Galois Theory, Addison–Wesley Publishing Company (1984).

External links 
 Mizar system proof: http://mizar.org/version/current/html/vectsp_9.html#T19

Lemmas in linear algebra
Matroid theory